Manuel Armindo Morais Cange (born 25 December 1984), commonly known as Locó, is a retired Angolan footballer who last played as a right back for Santos Futebol Clube de Angola.

He was noticeable during matches due to his unique hairstyle.

International career
Locó was a member of his national team, and was called up to the 2006 World Cup.

National team statistics

International goals
Scores and results list Angola's goal tally first.

References

External links

1984 births
Living people
Footballers from Luanda
Angolan footballers
Angola international footballers
2006 Africa Cup of Nations players
2006 FIFA World Cup players
2008 Africa Cup of Nations players
C.D. Primeiro de Agosto players
Association football defenders
Atlético Petróleos de Luanda players
Santos Futebol Clube de Angola players